Eleutherodactylus abbotti, sometimes known as the Abbott's robber frog, is a species of frog in the family Eleutherodactylidae endemic to Hispaniola (Haiti and the Dominican Republic). It is very common species inhabiting mesic woods and forest and open habitats, including urban areas. Typically it is found under litter, logs and trash.

References

abbotti
Amphibians of the Dominican Republic
Frogs of Haiti
Endemic fauna of Hispaniola
Amphibians described in 1923
Taxa named by Doris Mable Cochran
Taxonomy articles created by Polbot